Kinga Debreczeni-Klivinyi (born 31 March 1992) is a Hungarian handballer for Siófok KC and the Hungarian national team.

Career
She was capped for Hungary in various age categories and finished second on the top scorers' list of the 2009 European Women's U-17 Handball Championship with 55 goals. A year later, on the European Open Championship in Sweden, Klivinyi clinched the sixth place with the national team and was voted into the all-star team as the best playmaker of the tournament. In appreciation of her outstanding performances in 2010, she won the Heraklész Award, a sports prize given to the individuals in the younger age groups, who represented Hungary in their sports the most successfully. Thanks to her performances in 2011 she took the award in the following year again. In 2011, she was also chosen the best junior handballer of the country.

In 2012, she competed at the 2012 Women's Junior World Handball Championship in the Czech Republic.

Her husband is Dávid Debreczeni handball player. She announced in August 2020 her pregnancy.

Achievements
Nemzeti Bajnokság I:
Finalist: 2019
Bronze Medalist: 2010, 2014, 2015, 2016, 2017, 2018
Magyar Kupa:
Finalist: 2016, 2018, 2019
European Championship:
Bronze Medalist: 2012

Awards and recognition
 All-Star Playmaker of the European Open Championship: 2010
 Heraklész Award: 2010, 2011
 Hungarian Junior Handballer of the Year: 2011
 Best Player of the Carpathian Trophy: 2016

Personal life
She is married to fellow handball player, Dávid Debreczeni.

References

External links
Profile on Váci NKSE official website
Career statistics at Worldhandball

1992 births
Living people
Handball players from Budapest
Hungarian female handball players